Christiaan "Chris" Johannes van der Hoef (11 May 1875 – 5 March 1933) was a Dutch sculptor. He was born in Amsterdam and died in The Hague. In 1928 he won a silver medal in the art competitions of the Olympic Games for his "Médaille pour les Jeux Olympiques" ("Olympic medals"). Van der Hoef was a member of Nederlandsche Vereeniging voor Ambachts- en Nijverheidskunst (V.A.N.K.) the Dutch Association for Craft and Craft Art.

References

External links
 Hans Wichmann: Donationen und Neuerwerbungen 1986/87. Die Neue Sammlung, Staatl. Museum f. Angewandte Kunst, München, 1989. 
 L.F. Jintes & J.T. Pol-Tyszkiewicz: Chris van der Hoef 1875-1933. Leiden, 1994. 
 DatabaseOlympics.com: profile

1875 births
1933 deaths
Dutch male sculptors
Olympic silver medalists in art competitions
Artists from Amsterdam
20th-century Dutch sculptors
Medalists at the 1928 Summer Olympics
Olympic competitors in art competitions
20th-century Dutch male artists